Chicligasta Department is a department located in the southwest area of the Tucumán Province, Argentina. At the 2001 census, the department had a population of 75,133, making it the fourth most populous in the province and the most populous one in southern Tucumán. Chicligasta’s largest city, and its Department seat as well, is Concepción, with a population of about 50,000.

Geography
The department has a total area of 1,267 km. Plains cover the east portion, where most of the population dwells, and the west is mountainous and almost uninhabited.  Part of the latter area is included in the Campo de los Alisos National Park and the Cochuna Natural Reserve 

The highest peaks in the department are the Cerro del Bolsón (5550 m), Cerro de los Cóndores (5450m), and the Cerro de la Bolsa (5300 m) located in its westernmost portion, alongside the border with the Catamarca Province. They are part of a range called “Nevados del Aconquija” or simply, Aconquija. 

The Gastona River is the principal waterway. Other rivers are the Cochuna, de las Cañas, Seco and Medinas.

Adjacent districts
Monteros Department – north
Simoca Department – east and southeast 
Río Chico Department – south
Catamarca Province – west

Cities, towns and Rural communes
Alpachiri and El Molino
Alto Verde and Los Gucheas
Arcadia
Concepción
Gastona and Belicha 
Ingenio La Trinidad
Medinas

Transportation infrastructure

Major highways
National Route 38 
Tucumán Province Route 327
Tucumán Province Route 329
Tucumán Province Route 330 
Tucuman Province Route 331 
Tucuman Province Route 365

External links 
Tucuman Province Government Website

Departments of Tucumán Province